Castellina is the name of two cities in Tuscany, Italy:
 Castellina in Chianti
 Castellina Marittima